Charles P. Findley was a state representative Bibb County, Alabama in 1853. He also served as a justice of the peace.

References

Year of birth missing
Members of the Alabama House of Representatives